Falola is a Yoruba surname. Notable people with the surname include:

 Dizzy K Falola, Nigerian singer
 Toyin Falola (born 1953), Nigerian historian

Yoruba-language surnames